Kasba is a village in Galsi I CD block in Bardhaman Sadar North subdivision of Purba Bardhaman district in the Indian state of West Bengal. It is situated 12.7 km away from sub-district headquarters in Galsi. Bardhaman is the district headquarter of Kasba village. As per 2009 stats, Lowapur-Krishnarampur Gram Panchayet is the gram panchayat of Kasba village. Bardhaman is the nearest town to kasba for all major economic activities approximately 45km away.

History
Champaknagari, of Chand Sadagar and Manasamangal Kāvya fame, is believed to be located nearby. There are two mounds there – locals believe one to be Behula’s basarghar and the other to be Santali pahar. Both the mounds are believed to have association with Chand Sadagar.

Geography
The place is on the bank of Damodar River.

Demographics
As per the 2011 Census of India, Kasba had a total population of 2,119 of which 1,080 (51%) were males and 1,039 (49%) were females. Population below 6 years was 247. The total number of literates in  Kasba was 1,088 (58.12% of the population over 6 years).

Transport
It is about 14 km from Panagarh Railway station/NH 19 and 14 km from Budbud NH 19. It is known for its Shiv mandir to people from religious belief.

Education
Kasba Radharani Vidyamandir is a Bengali-medium, coeducational higher secondary school. It was established in 1968.

References

External links
 Maps of India | Kasba Village, Bardhaman
 Geolysis, | Kasba Village, Bardhaman
 Village Atlas | Kasba Village, Bardhaman
 Villages in Bardhaman District
 Map of Bardhaman district

 Villages in Purba Bardhaman district